Gopamau Assembly constituency is  157th of the 403 constituencies of the Uttar Pradesh Legislative Assembly,  India. It is a part of the Hardoi district and one  of the five assembly constituencies in the Hardoi Lok Sabha constituency.
 
Currently this seat belongs to Bharatiya Janata Party candidate Shyam Prakash who won in last Assembly election of 2017 Uttar Pradesh Legislative Elections defeating Samajwadi Party candidate Rajeshwari by a margin of 31,378 votes.

References

External links
 

Assembly constituencies of Uttar Pradesh
Politics of Hardoi district